Love Island is an American dating reality show based on the British series of the same name.

 In February 2022, the series was picked up for its fourth and fifth seasons by Peacock. The fourth season premiered on July 19, 2022.

Series overview

Episodes

Season 1 (2019)

The series was announced and commissioned on August 8, 2018, by CBS. It premiered on July 9, 2019, on CBS.

Season 2 (2020)

On August 1, 2019, the show was renewed for a second season and was originally scheduled to premiere on May 21, 2020. However, due to the ongoing COVID-19 pandemic in the United States, the production was postponed.
The second season production moved to The Cromwell Las Vegas with strict quarantine measures in place. It premiered on August 24, 2020.

Season 3 (2021)

On January 27, 2021, the series was renewed for a third season which is filmed in Hawaii. On May 13, 2021, it was announced that the third season will premiere on July 7, 2021.

Season 4 (2022)

Ratings

References

Lists of American reality television series episodes